Glen Boughton is a locality in the Cairns Region, Queensland, Australia. In , Glen Boughton had a population of 28.

Geography 
Contrary to the Queensland Government's usual guidelines on locality boundaries, Glen Boughton is a locality entirely within another locality (East Trinity). 

The locality is entirely freehold land with approximately half of it developed. The western part of the locality the land is flat (almost at sea level) and is used for farming, predominantly sugarcane. The eastern part of the locality is mountainous rising to approximately 400 metres at the eastern boundary (the Murray Prior Range); it is undeveloped land.

Hills Creek flows from east to west through the locality and after passing through East Trinity has its mouth at the Trinity Inlet.

Although Cairns City is only  NW from Glen Boughton, the road distance between them is  via Gordonvale as there are no bridges over the Trinity Inlet.

History 

By 1887, Messrs Clayton and John Hill had established a farm called Glen Boughton Estate raising cattle on cultivated grasses and were obtaining dairy cows as Cairns was experiencing increased demand for milk and butter. Their original plan was to grow sugarcane but changes in legislation about the use of Kanaka workers meant they decided to switch to dairying. They were experimenting with various kinds of fodder crop to see which was most productive on their land. Clayton appears to have left the farm to the sole owernship of John Hill by 1900; John Hill and his wife Mary Jane continued the farm until both had died (1933 and 1948 respectively).

On 11 February 1989 the locality was established and named after the Glen Boughton Estate.

References

External links 

Cairns Region
Localities in Queensland